Uvuru-Agada (Uvuru) is a community in Uzo Uwani, Enugu State, Nigeria. Originally known as Ogbo-Uvuru, the community is commonly called Uvuru-Agada after Agada, the community's founder. The community is led by a committee of the oldest men in each clan, known as Ndi-Idi-Uvuru, which is responsible for administering justice and resolving disputes.

Constituent villages
Uvuru-Agada consists of ten villages;
 Amono
 Inama
 Ogwu
 Okasibi
 Ugbene
 Umudia
 Umuntu
 Utokpu
Utomaka
Uvuru-ani

History
Uvuru's views on the origin and migration of its people are different from that of its neighbors. One version talks about Igala influence, while another version points to Eri-Nri influence. Another claim was that Eri-Nri influences in the area were outweighed by the influence of Attah of Igala as in many other localities within the Nsukka area.

Economy
Uvuru's economy depends on locally produced agricultural tools, including hoes (ogu), machetes (mma), axes, baskets and others. The most common staple crops are yam (multiple species), cassava, black beans, cocoyam (multiple species) and maize, among others. They also engage in artistic works such as craft sand, blacksmithing, carving, basket making, weaving and others. In addition, they cultivate fruit trees including oranges, plantain, banana, pawpaw and tangerine. Timber harvesting is another economic activity, owing to the rainforest trees in the farms.

Culture
The traditional religion of the area is henotheistic, with Chukwu Abiama as the highest deity. Chukwu Abiama is worshipped through lesser gods in their shrines. Inhabitants attached most of their socio-cultural, political and economic activities to their traditional African religion until the arrival of Christianity in 1910.

Education
The community has one government secondary school: Uvuru Secondary School and four government primary schools: Uvuru community primary school, Ogwu primary school, Uvuru-ani primary school and Okasibi-umuawa primary school.

References 

Populated places in Enugu State